The 2017 Hong Kong Sevens was the 42nd edition of the Hong Kong Sevens tournament, and the seventh tournament of the 2016–17 World Rugby Sevens Series. The tournament was played on 7–9 April 2017 at Hong Kong Stadium in Hong Kong.

England's Dan Norton scored his 245th career try during the tournament, breaking Kenya's Collins Injera's record of 244 career tries in the World Rugby Sevens Series.

Format
As in the last tournament, there will be a main draw with the fifteen World Series core teams and one invited team, and a qualifying tournament featuring twelve teams, the winner of which will be given core status in the next series.

The teams were drawn into four pools of four teams each. Each team plays all the others in their pool once. 3, 2 or 1 points for a win, draw or loss. The top two teams from each pool advance to the Cup brackets. The bottom two teams go into the Challenge trophy brackets.

Teams
The main tournament will consist of the fifteen core teams and one invited team

Main draw

World Series Qualifier
Teams will qualify for the World Series Qualifier tournament based on continental championships. The top two teams from each continent that are not already core teams will qualify.

Main draw

Pool stage

Pool A

Pool B

Pool C

Pool D

Knockout stage

13th Place

Challenge Trophy

5th Place

Cup

Player scoring
Most tries:
 Perry Baker (9)
 Joe Ravouvou (6)
 (Several players tied) (5)

Tournament placings

Source: World Rugby (archived)

World Series Qualifier

Pool stage

Pool E

Pool F

Pool G

Knockout stage

See also
2016-17 World Rugby Sevens Series
2017 Hong Kong Women's Sevens

References

External links

2017
rugby union
2016–17 World Rugby Sevens Series
2017 in Asian rugby union